Eupatorium toppingianum is a plant species in the family Asteraceae. It contains substituted chromenes which have anti-microbial properties.

References

toppingianum